Mirolepisma is a genus of Zygentoma in the family Lepismatidae, containing only a single species, Mirolepisma deserticola.

References

Lepismatidae
Monotypic insect genera